Paraduba owgarra is a species of butterfly of the family Lycaenidae. It is found in New Guinea.

References

Butterflies described in 1906
Polyommatini